This list of Salford Red Devils coaches details the records and achievements of coaches at the club.

Salford Red Devils Rugby League Football Club currently play in the Super League, a rugby league football competition. Known as Salford Rugby League until 1996 when they became Salford Reds and from 1999 to 2013 they were known as Salford City Reds. The current name change took place at the end of the 2013 and was inspired by a nickname the club had in the 1930s when they toured France.

Coaches
This list shows the coaches who have been in charge at Salford since the 1920s, exact dates are listed where possible.

Win percentage is rounded to one decimal place. The names of any caretaker coaches are supplied where known, and these periods are highlighted in italics.

Key

M: Matches played
W: Matches won
D: Matches drawn
L: Matches lost

References

Salford Coaching Register
Coach Harvey calls it quits
McCormack pays price at Salford
Salford Sack Coach Harrison
Parish quits Reds role
Phil Veivers: Salford sack head coach

Salford Red Devils
Salford Red Devils coaches
Salford Red Devils